Magway is the capital city of Magway Region (formerly Magway Division) of Myanmar, and situated on the banks of the Irrawaddy River. The Myathalun Pagoda, the beauty of Magway, located at the north of the city, is the landmark of Magway. Magway Region is famous for the cultivation of sesame and many kinds of nuts. It is also the second largest city of Magway Region and it is home to Magway Airport.

History 
During British Occupation, Magway was a township of Minbu Division (or) Minbu province. Minbu Region was established with 3 districts. They are Minbu District, Thayet District and Yenangyaung District. Magway was a township of Yenangyaung District until 1974.

On 2 March 1962, the military led by General Ne Win took control of Burma through a coup d'état, and the government has been under direct or indirect control by the military. A new constitution of the Socialist Republic of the Union of Burma was adopted in 1974.

By 1974, the name of Minbu region was changed to Magway Region and Yenangyaung District was abolished. Magway District was established with 6 townships. The Capital city was changed to Magway from Yenangyaung. In 1974, the urban population of Magway was 7,896.

Notable Places 
Mya Tha Lun Pagoda

Climate
Magway has a tropical wet and dry climate (Aw) bordering on a hot semi-arid climate (BSh) under the Köppen climate classification.

Education

List of universities and colleges in Magway 
Magway Education College 
Magway University 
Computer University, Magway
University of Medicine, Magway
University of Community Health, Magway
Technological University, Magway

Sports 

The 3,000-seat Magway Stadium is a multi-use stadium and used mostly for football matches. The stadium is the home ground of Magway F.C, a Myanmar National League (MNL) football club. But, Magway FC was abolished in 2020,October.

Health care

Public Hospitals 
 Magway Regional Hospital
 University Teaching Hospital of the University of Medicine (Magway)
 Magway Traditional Medicine Hospital

Future Plans 
 Magwe Inland port development project in Irrawaddy River
 A new Cinema
 Upgrading Magwe Airport
 Kantha Lake upgrading

References

External links 

Populated places in Magway Region
Township capitals of Myanmar